Scobie may refer to:

Surname
Bradford Scobie, New York City performance artist and comedian
 Edward Scobie (1918–1996), Dominican-born journalist, magazine publisher and historian
 Eric Scobie (born 1952), Scottish/Norwegian author and journalist
 Grace Scobie (1876–1957), Australian factory inspector and women's activist
 Jack Scobie (1891–1974), Australian rules footballer
 James Scobie (1826–1854), Scottish gold miner murdered at Ballarat, Victoria, Australia
 James Scobie (horseman) (1860–1940), Australian jockey and racehorse trainer
 Jason Scobie (born 1978), American baseball player
 Jonathan Goble (1827–1897), aka Jonathan Scobie, American Baptist missionary in Yokohama
 Margaret Scobie (born 1948), Australian indigenous Aboriginal painter
 Robert Scobie (Australian politician, born 1831) (1831–1909)
 Robert Scobie (Australian politician, born 1848) (1848–1917)
 Ronald Scobie (1893–1969), British Army lieutenant-general
 Stephen Scobie (born 1943), Canadian poet, critic, and scholar
 Wallace Scobie (born 1934), Scottish footballer

Other
 Arthur Edward Scobie Breasley (1914–2006), Australian jockey
 Mackay John Scobie Mackenzie (1845–1901), New Zealand politician
 Scobie Malone, fictional homicide detective created by Australian novelist Jon Cleary

See also
Scobie Breasley Medal, annual jockeys award in Melbourne

Lists of people by nickname
English-language surnames
Scottish surnames